Rufus Hardy may refer to:

Rufus Hardy (representative) (1855–1943), member of the U.S. House of Representatives from Texas
Rufus K. Hardy (1878–1945), leader and missionary in The Church of Jesus Christ of Latter-day Saints

See also
Hardy (disambiguation)
Rufus, a set index article about the name Rufus
Hardy (surname)